Niphoparmena kivuensis is a species of beetle in the family Cerambycidae. It was described by Stephan von Breuning in 1939, originally under the genus Mecynome.

It's 6–8½ mm long and 1⅔–2¾ mm wide, and its type locality is Tshibinda, DRC.

The synonym ''N. rufobrunneas type location is the Nyamukubi Mountains, DRC; its original description recorded its length as 9 mm and its width as 2⅔ mm.

The synonym N. rotundipennis'''s type location is Rutshuru, DRC and its original description recorded its length as 10 mm and its width as 3½ mm.

References

kivuensis
Beetles described in 1939
Taxa named by Stephan von Breuning (entomologist)